Günther's dwarf burrowing skink (Scelotes guentheri), also known commonly as  Günther's burrowing skink, was a species of lizard in the family Scincidae. The species was endemic to Natal, South Africa.

Description
S. guentheri is known from only one specimen which was collected in 1886. It has greatly reduced limbs. The forelimbs are entirely absent, and the hind limbs retain only two digits.

Etymology
The specific name, guentheri, and the common names are in honor of German-born British herpetologist Albert Günther.

Conservation status
S. guentheri is considered to be extinct.

References

Further reading
Boulenger GA (1887). Catalogue of the Lizards in the British Museum (Natural History). Second Edition. Volume III. ...Scincidæ ... London: Trustees of the British Museum (Natural History). (Taylor and Francis, printers). xii + 575 pp. + Plates I-XL. (Scelotes guentheri, new species, pp. 414–415 + Plate XXIV, figures 3, 3a, 3b, 3c).
Branch, Bill (2004). Field Guide to Snakes and other Reptiles of Southern Africa. Third Revised edition, Second impression. Sanibel Island, Florida: Ralph Curtis Books. 399 pp. . (Scelotes guentheri, p. 142).

Scelotes
Endemic reptiles of South Africa
Reptiles described in 1887
Taxa named by George Albert Boulenger
Taxonomy articles created by Polbot